Hakob Karapents, also known as Jack Karapetian, was a prolific Iranian-Armenian author born in 1925 in Tabriz, Iran.

He settled in the United States in 1947. He wrote numerous novels and short stories in both Armenian and English. He died in 1994 in Watertown, Massachusetts.

Selected writings
Novels
 Կարթագենի դուստրը (The Daughter of Carthago, Beirut, 1972)
 Ադամի գիրքը (The Book of Adam, New York, 1983)

Short Story Collections
 Անծանօթ հոգիներ (Unknown Souls, Beirut, 1970)
 Նոր աշխարհի հին սերմնացանները (The Old Sowers of the New World, Beirut, 1975)
 Միջնարար (Intermezzo, New York, 1981)
 Ամերիկեան շուրջպար (American Circle Dance, New York, 1986)
 Անկատար (Imperfect, New York, 1987)
 Մի մարդ ու մի երկիր եւ այլ պատմուածքներ (A Man and A Country and Other Stories, Watertown, Ma., 1994) 
 Return and Tiger and Other Short Stories, Tatul Sonentz-Papazian, tr. (Watertown, Ma., 1995)

Essays
 Երկու աշխարհ (Watertown, Ma., 1992)
 Մտորումներ (Arlington, Ma., 2009)

References

 
 

People from Tabriz
Armenian-language writers
American people of Armenian descent
Iranian emigrants to the United States
Iranian people of Armenian descent
1925 births
1994 deaths
Iranian male short story writers
20th-century American male writers